Klebahniella is a genus of green algae in the family Chaetophoraceae.

The genus name of Klebahniella is in honour of Heinrich Klebahn (1859–1942), who was a German mycologist and phytopathologist.

The genus was circumscribed by Ernst Johann Lemmermann in Forschungsber. Biol. Stat. Plön vol.3 on page 32 in 1895.

References

Chaetophorales genera
Chaetophoraceae